Chail is a town and a nagar panchayat in Kaushambi district  in the state of Uttar Pradesh, India. Nearest Market - Manauri bajar

Demographics
As of the 2011 Census of India, Chail had a population of 7,726. Males constitute 53% of the population and females 47%. Chail has an average literacy rate of 41%, lower than the national average of 59.5%; with male literacy of 51% and female literacy of 30%. 19% of the population is under 6 years of age.

References

Cities and towns in Kaushambi district